The 2009 Hungarian GP2 round was the sixth round of the 2009 GP2 Series season. It was held on July 25 and July 26, 2009 at Hungaroring in Mogyoród, Pest, Hungary. The race was used as a support race to the 2009 Hungarian Grand Prix.

Lucas di Grassi got his first ever pole position in GP2, despite being in the series for three years. Nico Hülkenberg won the first race, the German's third win in succession. Giedo van der Garde got the first points for iSport International since Spain with seventh, and followed that up with victory in the sprint race, his first victory in GP2.

Hülkenberg left Hungary with 57 points, still in the lead of the championship. ART Grand Prix and Barwa Addax Team were separated by 2 points in the teams championship.

Standings after the round 

Drivers' Championship standings

Teams' Championship standings

 Note: Only the top five positions are included for both sets of standings.

External links
http://www.autosport.com/results.php?s=205&y=2009&r=20092011&c=2
http://www.autosport.com/results.php?s=205&y=2009&r=20092012&c=2

Hungarian
GP2